The West Lothian Herald & Post was a weekly Scottish freesheet that delivered to households in Livingston, Linlithgow, Bathgate, Broxburn and surrounding areas from 1998 to 2012.

It consisted mainly of advertising and promotional pieces, with some editorial relating to local news and sport. It had a circulation of 48,000 and was owned by Johnston Press, which owns The Scotsman and Edinburgh Evening News.

References

External links
Herald & Post West Lothian

Defunct newspapers published in the United Kingdom
Newspapers published in Scotland
West Lothian
Newspapers published by Johnston Press